Mary Louise Roberts is an American historian currently the WARF Distinguished Lucie Aubrac Professor and Plaenert Bascom Professor of History at University of Wisconsin. For the 2020–2021 academic year, she additionally is Charles Boal Ewing Chair in Military History at the United States Military Academy.

Works 

 D-Day through French Eyes: Memoirs of Normandy 1944 (2014)
 Sheer Misery: Soldiers in Battle in WWII (2021)
 What Soldiers Do: Sex and the American GI in World War II France (2013)
 Disruptive Acts: The New Woman in Fin-De-Siecle France (2002)

References

External links 

 

Year of birth missing (living people)
Living people
University of Wisconsin–Madison faculty
American women historians
Brown University alumni
Wesleyan University alumni
21st-century American historians
21st-century American women writers
American military historians
Women military writers